Konstantinos Andravidiotis, also known with the surname Papadimitropoulos (Παπαδημητρόπουλος) or as "Captain Konstantis" (Καπετάν Κωνσταντής) was a chieftain of the Greek War of Independence from Andravida.

Biographical information
Andravidiotis was born in Andravida and had been active against the Ottoman rule since the pre-revolutionary period. Due to his action, he was forced to resort to Zakynthos, where he served in the British Army and became friends with Theodoros Kolokotronis and Charalambos Vilaetis. 

After the declaration of the Greek Revolution in Gastouni, on 29 March 1821 Andravidiotis came under the command of Georgios Sisinis and was appointed head of the armed forces of Elis, while he forced the local Ottoman forces to take refuge in the castle of Chlemoutsi. Then, he participated with other chieftains and notables to the revolutionary congress of Pyrgos where the action against the Albanians of Lala was decided. During the revolution, he took part in several battles including the Battle of Lala, the battle in Pousi, in Andravida, in Gastouni, in Patras, in Santameri and in Portes. In 1825 he became chiliarch.

With the creation of the independent Greek state, Andravidiotis remained in the army and was employed, among others, in 1831 along with Diakos and Koumaniotis in the pursuit of an armed group that operated in Elis, while in 1835 he took over the oursuit against the Chondrogiannis robber clan. In July 1847 he became major in the Royal Phalanx ranked in the 4th class among majors. After his retirement, he became mayor of Myrtoudion. He died in 1856. From his marriage, he had four daughters and three sons.

References

1856 deaths
People from Elis
Greek people of the Greek War of Independence
Hellenic Army officers
Members of the Royal Phalanx